The Hill is an album by David Murray released on the Italian Black Saint label in 1987. It features performances by Murray, Richard Davis and Joe Chambers.

Reception
The Allmusic review by Brian Olewnick awarded the album 3 stars, stating: "The Hill offers an accurate snapshot of Murray in the mid-'80s, straddling the mainstream and avant-garde and proving himself quite adept in either.".

Track listing
 "Santa Barbara and Crenshaw Follies" - 8:25  
 "The Hill" - 9:00  
 "Fling" (Butch Morris) - 7:09  
 "Take the Coltrane" (Duke Ellington) - 7:42  
 "Herbie Miller" - 5:52  
 "Chelsea Bridge" (Billy Strayhorn) - 10:31

All compositions by David Murray except as indicated
Recorded at Sound Ideas Studios, NYC, November 29, 1986

Personnel
David Murray - tenor saxophone, bass clarinet
Richard Davis - bass
Joe Chambers - drums, vibes

References 

1987 albums
David Murray (saxophonist) albums
Black Saint/Soul Note albums